= 1932–33 Plunket Shield season =

Cricket tournament in New Zealand

1932–33 Plunket Shield
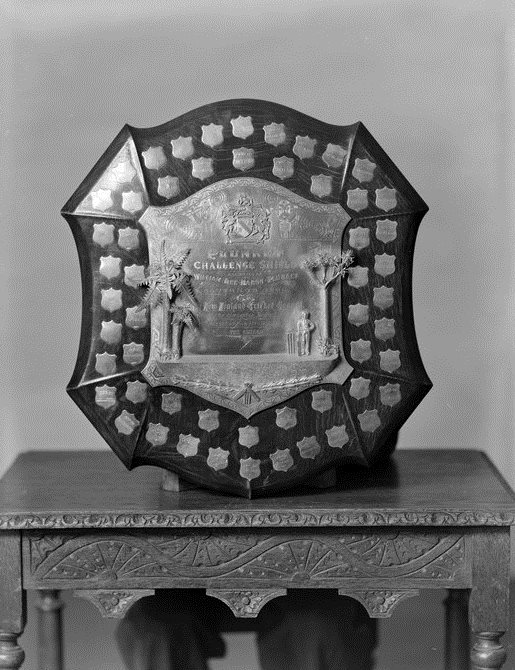
- The Plunket Shield trophy
- Cricket format: First-class
- Tournament format(s): Round-robin
- Champions: Otago (2nd title)
- Participants: 4
- Matches: 6

The 1932–33 Plunket Shield season was a tournament of the Plunket Shield, the domestic first-class cricket competition of New Zealand.

Otago won the championship, finishing at the top of the points table at the end of the round-robin tournament between the four first-class sides, Auckland, Canterbury, Otago and Wellington.

== Table ==
Below are the Plunket Shield standings for the season:

Team	Played	Won	Lost	Drawn	Points	NetRpW
Otago	3	2	0	1	20	4.741
Canterbury	3	1	1	1	12	1.900
Auckland	3	1	0	2	12	0.280
Wellington	3	0	3	0	0	-6.843
